Gregg County is a county located in the eastern part of the U.S. state of Texas. As of the 2020 census, its population was 124,239. Its county seat is Longview. The county is named after John Gregg, a Confederate general killed in action during the American Civil War.

Gregg County is part of the Longview, Texas metropolitan area and the Longview–Marshall, Texas combined statistical area. Discovery of oil near Kilgore, Texas, in October 1930 was the beginning of an oil boom that attracted workers to the county and expanded the population by more than 500% by 1940, according to the census. By that time, the economy had stabilized, but the East Texas Oil Field, extending into five counties, has continued to be important to the county and region's economy.

History 
This area was among early sections settled by United States immigrants before Texas became an independent republic, and after 1845, a state of the United States. It was an area developed as cotton plantations dependent on slave labor of African Americans. Lumbering of the pine forests was also pursued, especially in the early years of clearing the land for cultivation.

Gregg County was organized in 1873 after the American Civil War from portions of existing counties. When the Texas State Legislature convened in January 1873, Democratic representative B. W. Brown of Upshur County introduced a bill to create a new county from parts of Harrison, Rusk, and Upshur Counties. He was likely trying to break up the black majority that dominated county politics in Harrison County. Under Brown's proposal, the county was to be named Roanoke, and Longview was to be the county seat. The proposed name was later changed to honor Texas leader and Confederate General John Gregg, and the county seat was determined by popular election.

Harrison and Rusk Counties resisted efforts to have portions of their territory assigned to Gregg County. When Gregg County was created, it first consisted of about  taken from Upshur County, and the Sabine River was its southern boundary. Many of its voters continued to elect Republicans to county offices.

By 1919, the county population was 16,700, of whom 8,160, or 48%, were Black. Most were sharecroppers or tenant farmers raising cotton as a commodity crop. Members of the Negro Business League set up a cooperative store in Longview to compete with White merchants and offer African-American residents more choices for purchases. Beginning July 10, the town had a short-lived Longview Race Riot, in which one Black man was killed, and several Black-owned homes and properties were burned. It was quelled when the sheriff asked for Texas National Guard and other law enforcement. They established a curfew and military occupation.

Agricultural work declined during the Great Depression of the 1930s, and many African Americans continued to leave in the Great Migration north to find other work. In October 1930, oil was discovered in Henderson, Texas, near Kilgore. Suddenly, the county economy was booming, and the East Texas Oil Field attracted so many workers that county population increased by more than 500% by 1940. Growth stabilized, but oil has continued to be important. County demographics changed as other workers were attracted to the area. In the early 21st century, slightly less than 20% of the population is African American.

Texas Attorney General John Ben Shepperd, who served from 1953 to 1957, maintained a ranch in Gregg County near his native Gladewater. He also served on the Gregg County Commissioners Court for a brief period in 1949.

Geography

Major highways
  Interstate 20
  U.S. Highway 80
  U.S. Highway 259
  U.S. Highway 271
  State Highway 31
  State Highway 42

Adjacent counties
 Upshur County (north)
 Harrison County (east)
 Rusk County (south)
 Smith County (west)

Communities

Cities 

 Clarksville City (small part in Upshur County)
 East Mountain (mostly in Upshur County)
 Easton (partly in Rusk County)
 Gladewater (partly in Upshur County)
 Kilgore (small part in Rusk County)
 Lakeport
 Longview (small part in Harrison County)
 Warren City (small part in Upshur County)
 White Oak

Census-designated places 
 Lake Cherokee
 Liberty City

Other unincorporated communities 

 Danville
 Elderville
 Fredonia
 Gladewater Park
 Judson
 Kinsloe
 Seven Pines
 Shiloh
 Teneryville

Former communities 
 Greggton - annexed to Longview in the 1950s 
 Spring Hill - annexed to Longview on October 7, 1983

Demographics

Note: the US Census treats Hispanic/Latino as an ethnic category. This table excludes Latinos from the racial categories and assigns them to a separate category. Hispanics/Latinos can be of any race.

According to the 2000 census, 111,379 people, 42,687 households, and 29,667 families were residing in the county. According to the 2020 census, 124,239 people resided in the county, reflecting statewide population growth during the early 2000s-2020.

The racial makeup of the county was 72.89% White, 19.86% African American, 0.52% Native American, 0.68% Asian, 4.57% from other races, and 1.49% from two or more races; about 9.14% of the population was Hispanic or Latino of any race. In 2020, its racial and ethnic makeup was 54.77% non-Hispanic white, 20.10% Black or African American, 0.34% Native American, 1.30% Asian alone, 0.04% Pacific Islander, 0.24% some other race, 3.86% multiracial, and 19.35% Hispanic or Latino of any race, reflecting nationwide demographic diversification.

In 2000, median income for a household in the county was $35,006, and for a family was $42,617. Males had a median income of $33,186 versus $21,432 for females. The per capita income for the county was $18,449.  About 12.00% of families and 15.10% of the population were below the poverty line, including 20.50% of those under age 18 and 11.40% of those age 65 or over. By 2020, its median household income was $52,027 with a mean income of $73,022.

Education
These school districts serve Gregg County:
 Gladewater ISD (partly in Smith, Upshur Counties)
 Kilgore ISD (partly in Rusk County)
 Longview ISD
 Pine Tree ISD
 Sabine ISD
 Spring Hill ISD
 White Oak ISD

Media
Gregg County is part of the Tyler/Longview/Jacksonville DMA. Local media outlets are:  KLTV, KTRE-TV, KYTX-TV, KFXK-TV, KCEB-TV, and KETK-TV.

The Longview News-Journal is the primary newspaper in the county, published in Longview.  Coverage of the area can also be found in the Tyler Morning Telegraph, based in Tyler, in Smith County.  The Gladewater Mirror has been published since 1949, first as a daily newspaper and then as a weekly newspaper.

Gallery

Politics
Before the complete disfranchisement of rural freedmen, Gregg County's black freedmen allowed it to vote for William McKinley twice, and for several other Republicans during the Third Party System.

Gregg subsequently became a classic “Solid South” Democratic county between 1904 and 1948, but has since become solidly Republican at a Presidential level, although the presence of a sizeable black population has permitted the Democrats to gain a quarter of the countywide total at virtually every election. Nonetheless, Gregg was one of only 16 Texas counties to vote for Barry Goldwater in his 1964 definitive loss, and the last Democrat to carry the county was Harry S. Truman in 1948.

See also

 National Register of Historic Places listings in Gregg County, Texas
 Recorded Texas Historic Landmarks in Gregg County

References

External links
 Gregg County government's website
 Gregg County in Handbook of Texas Online at the University of Texas

 
1873 establishments in Texas
Populated places established in 1873
Longview metropolitan area, Texas